MCC Bicentenary Celebration match may refer to the following cricket matches:

MCC Bicentenary match, 1987
Bicentenary Celebration match, 2014